Hartono is a surname. Notable people with the surname include:

Robert Budi Hartono (born 1940), an Indonesian businessman
Rudy Hartono (born 1949), an Indonesian badminton player
Eddy Hartono (born 1964), an Indonesian badminton player
Nathan Hartono (born 1991), a Singaporean singer and actor
Arianne Hartono (born 1996), a Dutch tennis player